Albert Einstein: The Practical Bohemian is a stage play that is the only show officially endorsed by the Einstein family. A quote from Albert Einstein's first cousin said that the family "felt as though they were in the presence of their dear cousin Albert." The one-man show opened in 1978 written and performed by actor-writer Ed Metzger in Los Angeles, California.

Since that time, he has presented it throughout the world, including the Kennedy Center in Washington, D.C. The show, co-written by Metzger's wife Laya Gelff, is a portrayal about the man as well as the scientist, creating a portrait of one of the 20th Century's greatest minds, but who harbored dreams of being a solo violinist. The show highlights the curiosity that drove Einstein to seek answers to the mysteries of the universe. It shows his struggle as a pacifist, threatened by anti-semitism and forced to flee Germany, and eventually disappointed that his scientific discoveries were used in the creation of nuclear weapons.

References

External links 
 Albert Einstein: The Practical Bohemian website
 Einstein Quotes

Works about Albert Einstein
Plays by Ed Metzger
1978 plays
Plays based on real people
Plays for one performer
Cultural depictions of Albert Einstein
Plays set in the 20th century